The Irgiz ( Yrgyz) is a river in Aktobe and  Kostanay regions of Kazakhstan, a right tributary of the Turgay. It was the site of the Battle of the Irghiz River in the early 13th century.

Course
The Irgiz rises on the eastern slopes of the Mugodzhar Hills in the Aktobe region of Kazakhstan. It flows in a predominantly southerly direction to its confluence with the Turgay.

See also
List of rivers of Kazakhstan
Lakes of the lower Turgay and Irgiz

References

Rivers of Kazakhstan
Geography of Aktobe Region
Kostanay Region
Shalkarteniz basin